IDLC Finance Limited, formerly known as Industrial Development Leasing Company of Bangladesh Limited (IDLC), is a multi-product Non Banking Financial Institution with headquarters in Dhaka, Bangladesh. It offers financial services in the form of Small and Medium enterprise (SME) finance products, Supplier and Distributor finance, Corporate finance, Structured finance, retail finance, Deposits and Treasury products. The IDLC group also provides merchant banking, stock broker and asset management services via its three subsidiaries, IDLC Investments Limited, IDLC Securities Limited and IDLC Asset Management Limited, respectively.

History 
IDLC was established in 1985 by the initiation of IFC of the World Bank. The company was formed via collaboration of International Finance Corporation, German Investment and Development Company, Korea Development Financing Corporation, Aga Khan Fund for Economic Development, Kookmin Bank, IPDC Finance Limited of Bangladesh and Sadharan Bima Corporation. It has since emerged as a fully locally owned financial institution.

The Emerging Credit Rating Limited (ECRL) has given AAA long term credit rating and ECRL-1 short term credit rating to the IDLC Finance Limited.

Subsidiaries 
The following are the subsidiaries for IDLC Finance Limited:
 IDLC Securities Limited
 IDLC investments Limited
 IDLC Asset Management Limited

See also 
 IDLC Investments Limited
 IDLC Asset Management Limited
 IFC
 Non Banking Financial Institution

References

Further reading
 
 
 
 
 
 

Financial services companies established in 1985
Financial services companies of Bangladesh
Bangladeshi companies established in 1985